Ashleigh Carmen Francis (born 12 May 1988) is an Australian beauty queen from Sydney. She won the title of Miss World Australia in August 2010, which launched her as a TV presenter, model and media personality.

She is of Australian, Scottish and Jamaican descent.

In Miss World 2010, Francis placed in the finals for Beach Beauty, Sport and Talent (top 10).

In 2012, Francis was signed with G02, a travel show on Australia's SBS network which was due to air in 2013. Six episodes were shot and aired prior to the show being discontinued. During this time she was a featured guest on Please marry my boy and was also asked to be a guest in Australia's Big Brother and I’m a celebrity, get me out of here (UK version) which she was unable to commit to for unknown reasons.

Prior to Francis's involvement with Go2, she was involved with programmes such as FTV Australia (FashionTV), Unseentv, where she covered sporting and red carpet events.

Francis's previous ambassadorships and affiliates include:
 Lemon Detox – full campaign
 Face of Botani Skincare
 Florence and Ferrari cosmetics
 Skywalk (centre point tower) and Flowoxygen.

She has been involved  in charities and fundraising events with Gloria Jean's - Cappuccino for a cause Fujitsu Charity Golf Channel Nine's – Sydney Children's Hospital Telethon  McHappy Day 2010 and 2011 R U OK? Day, Day of Difference - Shen Yun Chinese Performing Arts  Schizophrenia Research Institute and Swear Stop Week. She continues being involved with various charities throughout the world.

See also
 Australia at major beauty pageants
 Miss Australia
 Miss World Australia

References

External links

 www.missworld.com
 www.missworld-australia.com

1989 births
Australian beauty pageant winners
Australian people of Jamaican descent
Australian people of Scottish descent
Models from Sydney
Living people
Shen Yun
Miss World 2010 delegates